Capys collinsi, the Collins' protea butterfly, is a butterfly in the family Lycaenidae. It is found in central Kenya. The habitat consists of montane grassland.

The larvae feed on Protea gaguedi.

References

Butterflies described in 1988
Capys (butterfly)